Shahrak-e Boniad (also Romanized as Shahrak-e Bonīād) is a village in Badr Rural District, in the Central District of Ravansar County, Kermanshah Province, Iran. At the 2006 census, its population was 383, in 86 families.

References 

Populated places in Ravansar County